Claude Moine (born 3 July 1942), known professionally as Eddy Mitchell, is a French singer and actor. He began his career in the late 1950s, with the group Les Chaussettes Noires (The Black Socks). He took the name Eddy from the American expatriate tough-guy actor Eddie Constantine (later the star of Jean-Luc Godard's Alphaville), and chose Mitchell as his last name simply because it sounds American. The band performed at the Parisian nightclub Golf-Drouot before signing to Barclay Records and finding almost instant success; in 1961 it sold two million records.

Heavily influenced by American rock and roll, Mitchell (who went solo in 1963) has often recorded outside France, at first in London, but later in Memphis and Nashville, Tennessee. Guitarists Big Jim Sullivan and Jimmy Page and drummer Bobby Graham were among the British session musicians who regularly supported him in London. For his American recordings he employed session men such as Roger Hawkins, David Hood, Jimmy Johnson, Kenneth Buttrey, Reggie Young, David Briggs, Charlie McCoy, Leland Sklar, Booker T. Jones, Steve Cropper and others.

A great lover of American films, he hosted La Dernière Séance, a TV show about American cinema from 1981 to 1998 on FR3 (later France 3). Its format was like an old-fashioned double-feature picture show, with two movies, cartoons, newsreels, and stage attractions. The title was taken from the name of one of Mitchell's albums, which in turn took it from the French title of the movie The Last Picture Show.

He is also the voice of Dylan (Flappy) in the French version of the 2005 film of The Magic Roundabout, as well as the voice of Chanticleer in the French version of Rock-a-Doodle.

Discography

Albums
with Les 5 Rocks
1960 – Les 5 Rocks (remained unreleased until 1996)
with Les Chaussettes noires
1961 : 100% rock 
1961 : Rock'n'Twist
1962 : Le 2 000 000e disque des Chaussettes noires (1st official studio album) 
1962 : Comment réussir en amour (soundtrack of film with same title)
1963 : Chaussettes Noires Party (2nd and last studio album)
Solo studio albums
1963 : Voici Eddy... c'était le soldat Mitchell
1963 : Eddy in London
1964 : Panorama
1964 : Toute la ville en parle... Eddy est formidable
1965 : Du rock 'n' roll au rhythm 'n' blues
1966 : Perspective 66
1966 : Seul
1967 : De Londres à Memphis
1968 : Sept Colts pour Schmoll
1969 : Mitchellville
1971 : Rock n'Roll
1972 : Zig-zag
1972 : Dieu bénisse le rock'n'roll
1974 : Ketchup électrique
1974 : Rocking in Nashville
1975 : Made in USA
1976 : Sur la route de Memphis
1977 : La Dernière Séance
1978 : Après minuit
1979 : C'est bien fait
1980 : Happy Birthday
1982 : Le Cimetière des éléphants
1984 : Fan Album
1984 : Racines
1986 : Eddy Paris Mitchell
1987 : Mitchell
1989 : Ici Londres
1993 : Rio Grande
1996 : Mr. Eddy
1999 : Les Nouvelles Aventures d'Eddy Mitchell
2003 : Frenchy
2006 : Jambalaya
2009 : Grand écran
2010 : Come Back
2013 : Héros
2015 : Big Band
2017 : La Même Tribu (Volume 1)2018 : La Même Tribu (Volume 2)Live albums
1969 : Olympia 691975 : Rocking in Olympia 19751978 : Palais des Sports 771981 : 20 ans : Eddy Mitchell Olympia1984 : Palais des Sports 841991 : Casino de Paris 901994 : Retrouvons notre héros Eddy Mitchell à Bercy1995 : Big Band au Casino de Paris1995 : Country-Rock à l'Olympia1995 : Show 94 au Zénith1997 : Mr. Eddy à Bercy 972001 : Live 20002004 : Frenchy Tour2007 : Jambalaya Tour2011 : Ma Dernière SéanceEddy Mitchell (Sessions outside France)
Eddy Mitchell recorded many albums mainly in the UK and in the United States, in the following locations:
 London (England):
1967 – De Londres à Memphis1993 – Rio Grande (in London and in Muscle Shoals (Alabama))
 Nashville (Tennessee):
1974 – Rocking in Nashville1975 – Made in USA1976 – Sur la route de Memphis1977 – La Dernière Séance1978 – Après minuit1979 – C'est bien fait (also in Muscle Shoals Alabama)
1980 – Happy Birthday (also in Muscle Shoals Alabama)
1981 – Le cimetière des éléphants (also in Los Angeles and New York City)
1984 – Fan Album (également à Paris)
1984 – Racines1987 – Mitchell Memphis and Nashville (Tennessee):
1996 – Mr. Eddy Memphis, Tennessee, Los Angeles, California and New Orleans, Louisiana:
1999 – Les nouvelles aventures d'Eddy Mitchell Los Angeles (California) :
2003 – Frenchy Burbank (California):
2007 – Jambalaya2009 – Grand Écran2010 – Comeback (also in Paris, France)

Filmography
 Les Parisiennes, in the segment Ella (Jacques Poitrenaud,1962
 Comment réussir en amour (Michel Boisrond, 1963)
 Nanou, TV series (Georges Régnier, 1970)
 Ça va plaire, TV musical (Jean-Pierre Cassel et Bernard Lion, 1980)
 Gaston Lapouge, TV film (Frank Apprederis, 1981)
 Coup de torchon (Bertrand Tavernier, 1981)
 My Other Husband (Georges Lautner, 1983)
  (1984)
 À mort l'arbitre (Jean-Pierre Mocky, 1983)
 Frankenstein 90 (Alain Jessua, 1984)
 La Galette du roi (Jean-Michel Ribes, 1986)
 I Love You (Marco Ferreri, 1986)
 Autour de minuit (Round Midnight) (cameo) (Bertrand Tavernier, 1986)
 Un père et passe (Sébastien Grall, 1989)
 Promotion canapé (Didier Kaminka, 1990)
 Until the end of the World (Bis ans Ende der Welt) (Wim Wenders, 1991)
 La Totale! (Claude Zidi, 1991)
 Ville à vendre (Jean-Pierre Mocky, 1992)
 La Cité de la peur (Alain Berbérian, 1994)
 Le bonheur est dans le pré (Étienne Chatiliez, 1995)
 Cuisine américaine (Jean-Yves Pitoun, 1998)
 Kitchendales (Chantal Lauby, 2000)
 Lovely Rita, sainte patronne des cas désespérés (Stéphane Clavier, 2003)
 Les Clefs de bagnole (Laurent Baffie, 2003)
  Frank Passingham, (2005)
 Un printemps à Paris (Springtime in Paris) (Jacques Bral, 2006)
 Populaire (Régis Roinsard, 2012)
 The Dream Kids (Vianney Lebasque, 2013)
 Salaud, on t'aime (Claude Lelouch, 2014)

Bibliography

by Eddy MitchellGalas, galères, autobiography (Éditions Jacques Grancher, 1979)Cocktail Story, recipes and anecdotes (R.M.C. Éditions, 1986)P'tit Claude'', novel (L'Arbre à cames, 1994)

References

External links

A biography (in English) at Radio France Internationale
 
 

1942 births
Living people
Male actors from Paris
Singers from Paris
French rock singers
French male singers
French male film actors
French male voice actors
French singer-songwriters
Best Supporting Actor César Award winners
20th-century French male actors
21st-century French male actors
French male television actors
French male singer-songwriters